Ion Finteșteanu (1899–1984) was a Romanian stage and film actor.

Selected filmography
 The Gypsy Girl at the Alcove (1923)
 A Lost Letter (1953)
 The Protar Affair (1956)
 Titanic Waltz (1964)

References

Bibliography 
 Goble, Alan. The Complete Index to Literary Sources in Film. Walter de Gruyter, 1999.

External links 
 

1899 births
1984 deaths
Male actors from Bucharest
Romanian male film actors
Romanian male silent film actors
Romanian male stage actors